Theodore 'Wayne' Mitchell (August 22, 1952 — July 12, 2019) was a Penobscot politician. He was elected by the Penobscot Tribe of Maine to serve as a non-voting tribal representative to the Maine House of Representatives beginning in 2008. He was re-elected in 2010 and 2012. From 2009 to 2010, Mitchell served on the Judiciary Committee. During the 125th and 126th legislatures, Mitchell served on the Veterans and Legal Affairs Committee. He was unenrolled.

References

21st-century American politicians
1952 births
2019 deaths
Maine Independents
Members of the Maine House of Representatives
Native American state legislators in Maine
Native American people from Maine
Penobscot people
20th-century Native Americans
21st-century Native Americans